Sewerynów may refer to the following places:
Sewerynów, Łask County in Łódź Voivodeship (central Poland)
Sewerynów, Skierniewice County in Łódź Voivodeship (central Poland)
Sewerynów, Lublin Voivodeship (east Poland)
Sewerynów, Gostynin County in Masovian Voivodeship (east-central Poland)
Sewerynów, Kozienice County in Masovian Voivodeship (east-central Poland)
Sewerynów, Łosice County in Masovian Voivodeship (east-central Poland)
Sewerynów, Radom County in Masovian Voivodeship (east-central Poland)
Sewerynów, Sochaczew County in Masovian Voivodeship (east-central Poland)
Sewerynów, Węgrów County in Masovian Voivodeship (east-central Poland)